The  is a city-supported history museum located in the city of Gifu, Gifu Prefecture, Japan. Located in Gifu Park at the base of Mount Kinka, it is in the heart of Gifu City's sightseeing area.

The museum primarily focuses on the history and traditional crafts of the surrounding area and includes a recreation of a Warring States Period free market that was created by Oda Nobunaga, a leading feudal lord of the 16th century, as well as many hands-on exhibits. However, the museum often hosts special exhibitions, which cover a wide variety of themes.

History
Planning for the museum began in 1972 as a result of an initiative by the local Social Education Committee. Construction was completed in 1985 and the museum opened in November of that year. In March 2005, after undergoing extensive renovations, the museum held a grand renewal opening, just in time for its 20th anniversary that November.

Currently, both the Eizō & Tōichi Katō Memorial Art Museum in Gifu Park and the Yanaizu Folklore Museum in Yanaizu-chō serve as branches to the museum.

Hands-on activities
The history museum offers the following activities:
Historical Gifu
The first area of the permanent exhibit is dedicated to Gifu's early history, going back to the Jōmon period. Visitors can try their hand at putting together a broken vase, making their own designs on a clay vase, ringing an ancient bell, or wearing old armor.
Warring States period
The second permanent area focuses on the Warring States period of Gifu's history, when Gifu received its name and first flourished. Men and women can try on period clothing, visit recreated stores and houses, have koma battles, or practice ryūgo or sugoroku.
Modern Gifu
The last section of the permanent exhibit focuses on Gifu's more recent history. There are scent boxes that represent each of Gifu's traditional industries, musical recordings and pictorial slides from decades ago, and an opportunity for visitors to make their own ukiyo-e (see right) of Gōdo-juku, one of Gifu's two former post towns on the Nakasendō.

Facilities information
Contact
Address: 2-18-1 Ōmiya-chō, Gifu, Gifu Prefecture
Hours of Operation
9:00am to 5:00pm (entry until 4:30pm)
Holidays
Mondays (Tuesday, if Monday is a holiday)
Day after national holidays
Dec. 29 to Jan. 3
Entrance Fee
{| class="wikitable"
|-
! Permanent Exhibit
! Individual Rate
! Group Rate
|-
| Adult
| 300 yen
| 240 yen
|-
| Child
| 150 yen
| 90 yen
|}
Group discounts are available to parties of 20 or larger.
Those over 70 years of age are allowed free admission.
Special exhibit fees are separate.

Access
From JR Gifu Station (Bus Platform 11) or Meitetsu Gifu Station (Bus Platform 4), board any bus operated by Gifu Bus heading towards Nagara. Get off the bus at "Gifu Kōen, Rekishi Hakubutsukan-mae," approximately 15 minutes from the train stations.

References

Buildings and structures in Gifu
History museums in Japan
Museums in Gifu Prefecture
Museums established in 1985
1985 establishments in Japan